
The following lists events that happened during 1811 in South Africa.

Events
 Xhosas clash with the white settlers on the eastern frontier starting the 4th Cape Frontier War
 Taps and iron pipes are installed for the first time in Cape Town
 The settlement of Caledon is established with the building of a Dutch Reformed Church
 Regular circuit courts are introduced
 23 April - The settlement of George Town is founded
 5 July - Henry George Grey is re-appointed provisional Governor of the Cape Colony
 6 September - Sir John Francis Cradock is appointed Governor of the Cape Colony

Deaths
 Sebastian Cornelis Nederburgh, Commissioner-general of the Cape

References
See Years in South Africa for list of references.

History of South Africa